The 1969 Torneio do Norte was the second edition of a football competition held in Brazil, featuring 12 clubs. Remo won your second title and earn the right to play in the finals of 1969 Torneio Norte-Nordeste.

First stage

Group 1

Subgroup A

Subgroup B

Group 2

Subgroup A

Subgroup B

Final stage

References

Torneio do Norte
1969 in Brazilian football
Torneio do Norte